Marius is a male given name, a Roman family name, and a modern surname.

The name Marius was used by members of the Roman gens Maria. It is thought to be derived from either the Roman war god Mars or from the Latin root mas or maris meaning "male". It may also derive from the Latin word mare meaning "sea", the plural of which is maria.

In Christian times, it was syncretized as a masculine form of the unrelated feminine given name Maria, from the Hebrew Miriam, Aramaic variant Mariam, and used alongside it.

Today, the name Marius is a common given name in Romania, Norway, and Lithuania. The name is also used in the Philippines, France, Denmark, Germany, Catalonia, the Netherlands, and South Africa.

The Greek name Marios (Μάριος), the Italian and Spanish name Mario, the Polish name Mariusz, and the Portuguese name Mário are all derived from Marius.

People
Notable people with the name include:

Romans
Gaius Marius (157–86 BC), Roman general
Gaius Marius the Younger (ca. 110/108–82 BC), son of Gaius Marius
Gaius Marius Victorinus (4th century AD) Roman philosopher
Marcus Aurelius Marius, (d. AD 269), Gallic Emperor
Marcus Marius (quaestor 76 BC) (fl. 76 BC), Roman quaestor and proquaestor
Marcus Marius Gratidianus (d. 82 BC), Roman praetor
Marius Maximus (fl. early 3rd century AD), Roman senator and biographer of Emperors

Given name
Marius Ambrogi (1895–1971), French fighter pilot in both World Wars
Marius Amundsen (born 1992), Norwegian footballer
Marius Antonescu (born 1992), Romanian rugby union player
Marius Bianchi (1823–1904), French politician
Marius Borg Høiby (born 1997), first child of Mette-Marit, Crown Princess of Norway
Marius Bourrelly (1820–1896), French poet and playwright 
Marius Brenciu (born 1973), Romanian operatic tenor
Marius Bunescu (1881–1971), Romanian painter
Marius Cazeneuve (1839–1913), French stage magician 
Marius Clore (born 1955), British-American molecular biophysicist and structural biologist
Marius Job Cohen (born 1947), Dutch jurist and politician
Marius Constant (1925–2004), French composer and conductor
Marius Copil (born 1990), Romanian tennis player
Marius Crainic (born 1973), Romanian mathematician
Marius Ebbers (born 1978), German footballer
Marius Erinkveld (born 1986), Dutch Supervisor
Marius Gabriel (born 1954), South African author
Marius Girard (1838-1906), French poet
Marius Goring (1912–1998), English actor
Marius Grigonis (born 1994), Lithuanian basketball player
Marius Grout (1903–1946), French writer
Marius Hasdenteufel (1894–1918), French World War I flying ace
Marius Jouveau (1878–1949), French poet
Marius Kižys (born 1982), Lithuanian footballer
Marius Louw (born 1964), South African author
Marius Lăcătuş (born 1964), Romanian footballer
Marius von Mayenburg (born 1972), German actor
Marius Mercator (about 390–451), Latin Christian ecclesiastical
Marius Mircu (1909–2008), Romanian journalist and memoirist
Marius Mitrea (born 1982), Romanian–Italian rugby union referee
Marius Müller-Westernhagen (born 1948), German musician and actor
Marius Nasta (1890–1965), Romanian physician and scientist
Marius Michel Pasha (1819-1907), French architect and lighthouse builder
Marius Petipa (1819–1910), French-Russian ballet dancer and choreographer
Marius Roustan (1870-1942), French politician.
Marius Russo (1914–2005), American baseball player (pitcher)
Marius Sestier (1861–1928), French cinematographer
Marius Trésor (born 1950), French footballer
Marius Tucă (born 1966), Romanian journalist and TV host presenter 
Marius Urzică (born 1975), Romanian gymnast
Marius Yo (born 2000), Japanese–German singer

Surname
Clinton Marius (1966–2020), South African performer and writer
Richard Marius (1933–1999), American Reformation scholar
Simon Marius or Simon Mayr (1573–1624), German astronomer
Simon Marius or Simon Mayr (1763–1845), German composer

Fictional or legendary characters
Marius de Romanus, an ancient Roman vampire in Anne Rice's Vampire Chronicles book series 
Marius of Britain, legendary king of the Britons during the Roman occupation
Marius Pontmercy, in Victor Hugo's novel Les Misérables
Marius, protagonist of the novel Marius the Epicurean by Walter Pater
Marius Von Hagen, one of the four male leads in the otome game Tears of Themis
Marius Titus, the playable protagonist in the video game Ryse: Son of Rome

See also
Maria gens
Mario (given name)
Marius (disambiguation)
Mariusz

Ancient Roman nomina
Dutch masculine given names
German masculine given names
Lithuanian masculine given names
Norwegian masculine given names
Romanian masculine given names